Siphonaria stewartiana is a species of air-breathing sea snail, a false limpet, a marine pulmonate gastropod mollusc in the family Siphonariidae, the false limpets.

Distribution
This marine species is endemic to New Zealand and the Kerguelens

References

 Powell A. W. B., New Zealand Mollusca, William Collins Publishers Ltd, Auckland, New Zealand 1979 
  Spencer, H.G., Marshall, B.A. & Willan, R.C. (2009). Checklist of New Zealand living Mollusca. Pp 196-219. in: Gordon, D.P. (ed.) New Zealand inventory of biodiversity. Volume one. Kingdom Animalia: Radiata, Lophotrochozoa, Deuterostomia. Canterbury University Press, Christchurch

External links
 

Siphonariidae
Gastropods of New Zealand
Gastropods described in 1939
Taxa named by Arthur William Baden Powell
Endemic fauna of New Zealand
Endemic molluscs of New Zealand